Trichodinidae is a family of ciliates of the order Mobilida, class Oligohymenophorea. Members of the family are ectoparasites (or, alternatively, ectocommensals) of a wide variety of aquatic organisms, including fish, amphibians, hydrozoans, molluscs and crustaceans.

Suggestion from an anonymous editor: Trichodina actually infect Hydra too, so someone needs to add that in, along with a citation.

Genera 
The family consists of four genera.
 Dipartiella Stein, 1961
 Paratrichodina Lom, 1963
 Trichodina Ehrenberg, 1830
 Trichodinella Srámek-Husek, 1953

References 

Oligohymenophorea
Parasitic alveolates
Ciliate families